Mabe (variant:  La Vabe) is a village and civil parish in Cornwall, England, United Kingdom. The village is situated one mile (1.6 km) west of Penryn.

Mabe parish is bounded by Stithians and Ponsanooth to the north, Budock to the east, Mawnan and Constantine to the south and Wendron to the west. Mabe parish is twinned with the Breton town of Primelin. Mabe parish population was 2,083 at the 2011 census, whereas the ward population covering a larger area was 5,802

The parish lies at the eastern edge of the Carnmenellis Granite intrusion. It is surrounded by several working and closed quarries. The Argal and College reservoirs lie to the south of the village.

The settlement of Mabe Burnthouse is situated on a hill overlooking Penryn and to the southwest is the location of the parish church, the Church of Saint Laud, which is dedicated to Saint Laudus, Bishop of Coutances.

History
Mabe was located in the Deanery of Carnmarth and belonged to the hundred of Kerrier.  Its population was approximately 512 in 1837. In addition to the chapel, there was an almshouse.

There are granite quarries at Carnsew which belonged to the firm of Freeman & Macleod. As of 1972 the Trolvis quarry was still working.

Culture and community
A Community Primary School with 119 pupils serves the area. Near the Antron Hill cross-roads, there is a pub, "The New Inn" and a Post Office General Stores.

Mabe Ladies Choir was founded in 1931 by Edgar S. Kessell MBE and continues to this day.

Parish church

The 15th century tower and porch survived a lightning strike. The remainder of the church was re-built from 1866, under the direction of Piers St. Aubyn. In the churchyard, there is an ancient menhir and a Celtic cross.  The latter was found in the vicarage garden and installed near the porch, at some time between 1919 and 1930. There is another cross at Helland, a farm where there was a garden formerly the site of an ancient chapel.

Notable residents
Sam Toy, former chairman of Ford of Britain was born here, as was Roger Hosen, the Cornwall and England rugby player. Thomas Tregosse, Puritan minister, sometime Vicar of Mylor and Mabe, was ejected from his benefices for his religious views.

Gallery

External links

 Mabe Parish Council Website

References

Villages in Cornwall
Civil parishes in Cornwall